The District Council of Grace was a local government area in South Australia from 1874 to 1935, seated at Mallala.

History
The council was proclaimed on 2 April 1874. Its jurisdiction consisted of the north west two thirds of the Hundred of Grace as the portion of the hundred south of the River Light had already been incorporated into the District Council of Port Gawler in 1856. The inaugural councillors in 1874 were proclaimed as Thomas Sutton, William Bartlett, Samuel Chivell, George Marshman, and Bryan McHugh, the elder.

On 1 May 1935, it was amalgamated with the district councils of Port Gawler (to the south) and Dublin (to the west) to create the District Council of Light. The new district council was subsequently renamed as the District Council of Mallala in 1937 and again as the Adelaide Plains Council in 2016.

Chairmen
The following persons were elected to serve as chairman of the district council for the following terms:
 W. Bartlett (1874)
 H.B. Moody (1874-75)
 B. McHugh (1875-76)
 G. Marshman (1876-79)
 N.J.W. Lindsay (1879-80)
 G. Marshman (1880-82)
 J. Jeffries (1882-83)
 J. Forbes (1883-85)
 G. Marshman (1885-86)
 R. Butler (1886-94)
 G. Marshman (1894-1913)
 J. Nairne (1913-20)
 A.H. Marshman (1920-29)
 P.J. Brady (1929-35)

References

Grace, District Council of
1874 establishments in Australia
1935 disestablishments in Australia